2016 NBA season may refer to:

2015–16 NBA season
2016–17 NBA season